A Carne (in ) is a 1888 Naturalist novel by Júlio Ribeiro. It is one of the most controversial works of the Brazilian literature, being frequently compared and considered as a forerunner to D. H. Lawrence's Lady Chatterley's Lover.

Plot
Lenita is a young, naïve 22-year-old woman who, recently orphaned, goes to live with an old farmer who raised her father. In the farmer's house, she meets his son, Manuel Barbosa, a divorced man. They soon start a forbidden love relationship.

Criticism
A Carne has themes considered to be "strong" for the time it was released (the 19th century), such as divorce and heavy eroticism, among others. Many people have negatively reviewed the romance, such as José Veríssimo and Alfredo Pujol. The most vehement critic was the priest Sena Freitas, who wrote an article entitled A Carniça for the famous newspaper Diário Mercantil, for which the book's author, Júlio Ribeiro, also worked. Ribeiro refuted Freitas' critiques in the articles O Urubu Sena Freitas. Freitas' and Ribeiro's articles were compiled and published posthumously in 1934 under the title Uma Polêmica Célebre.

Ribeiro once said, referring to his position:

Adaptations
The novel was adapted into an eponymous film in 1975. Directed by J. Marreco, it starred Selma Egrei, Newton Prado and Geraldo Del Rey. Unlike the book however, it was not a controversial film, since it was made during the "pornochanchada" period.

References

External links
 Downloadable version of the book 

1888 novels
Brazilian erotic novels
Naturalist novels
Brazilian novels adapted into films